Lee Jin-ah (born March 16, 1991) is a South Korean singer-songwriter and jazz pianist. After finishing in third place on SBS's K-pop Star 4, she signed with Antenna in 2015.
Her distinctive musical style combines jazz with pop and R&B, often featuring whimsical lyrics.

Personal life
Lee Jin-ah majored in applied music at Seoul Institute of the Arts.

In 2011, she took part in Gospel Star C season 1, the CCM singer audition program of the C-channel, as a member of the team called "Snowdrop”, reaching the final TOP 10.

On March 5, 2012, she participated in the 9th Tune Up, a musician-support program of the CJ Cultural Foundation, as "JinA" and was finally selected as the musician in the 9th Tune Up.

Lee debuted in 2013 with her first album, Invisible.  Kim Soo-jin, music director, who produced the OST of famous dramas such as White Tower, Sign, and Seon-deok Queen produced this album. Lee Han-jin, the professor of applied music at Seoul Institute of the Arts participated in this album as a jazz trombone performer. This album is too intense to be a debut of a new musician.

She was a member of the "JinA Band". The other members of "JinA Band" were Park Hyun(contrabass) and Cho Sun Kyun(drums) before and after K-pop Star 4.

In 2014, she challenged K-pop Star 4, the tv audition program on SBS. She performed seven self-written songs, which is rare in audition programs. She drew rave reviews from the judges with her performances. JYP Entertainment CEO Park Jin-young, one of the three judges, became especially impressed, saying he "might as well quit the music industry now."   Antenna Entertainment CEO You Hee-yeol drew attention by saying, "I think I saw here the reality of a female musician who I had dreamed of not being able to conclude or define." Lee and her songs became very popular through this program. On April 5 she won 3rd place.

In 2015 she signed with the Antenna.

In 2017, her first EP Random was released. She produced all songs in it by the recommendation of  her agency CEO You Hee-yeol. You Hee-yeol said to her not to pay much attention to the album's success. "Lee Jin-ah is the musician who shows her true value at a concert hall.", he praised. In the EP, the song "Stairs" was very noticed by critics with the hilarious harmony of pop and jazz, and in the title song "Random", the lyrics describe an experience in which she discovered an unexpected joy while listening to music in random play.  She said this song contains the meaning of discarding prejudice in music and other things.

In 2017 Park Jong-woo(bass) joined the "Lee Jin-ah trio". Another member of the "Lee Jin-ah Trio" is Seo Ju-young(drums). Both Lee Jin-ah and Seo Ju-young entered Seoul Institute of the Arts in the same year. Park Jong-woo was a year senior. Park and Seo have sometimes participated in composing and arranging her songs.

In 2018, Jinah Restaurant Full Course was released. She participated in the lyrics and composition of all songs in this album.

Lee married pianist Shin Sung-jin in March 2019. They met as music students at Seoul Institute of the Arts. Shin has steadily participated in her songs by playing musical instruments, rhythm programming, and string arrangements.

In 2020, her second EP, Candy Pianist was released. By participating in writing and composing all the songs in this EP, Lee once again proved her ability as a singer-songwriter. The theme of it is 'Awakening', which is clearly shown in the title song "Dreamlike Alarm", "Awake(Feat. Sam Kim)", and other tracks. This EP contains Lee’s desire to give strength and motivate those who listen to her music as a candy pianist.

In 2021, she made her debut as a film music director with Children Are Happy OST.

Discography

Studio albums

Soundtrack albums

Extended plays

Singles

K-pop Star 4 songs

Soundtrack appearances

Other appearances

Songwriting credits
The following credits are adapted from the Korea Music Copyright Association database.

Filmography

Awards and nominations

References

External links
 Official fancafe
 Antenna Mufan cafefficial website

1991 births
Living people
South Korean jazz singers
South Korean women pop singers
South Korean female idols
South Korean singer-songwriters
South Korean keyboardists
South Korean pop pianists
South Korean women pianists
People from Gwangju, Gyeonggi
K-pop Star participants
Seoul Institute of the Arts alumni
Antenna Music artists
21st-century South Korean singers
21st-century South Korean women singers
21st-century pianists
South Korean women singer-songwriters
20th-century women pianists
21st-century women pianists